The 1972 Pacific Southwest Open was a men's tennis tournament played on outdoor hard courts at the Los Angeles Tennis Center in Los Angeles, California in the United States. The tournament was classified as Grade A and was part of the Grand Prix tennis circuit. It was the 46th edition of the tournament and ran from September 18 through September 24, 1972. Third-seeded Stan Smith won the singles title.

Finals

Singles

 Stan Smith defeated  Roscoe Tanner 6–4, 6–4

Doubles

 Jimmy Connors /  Pancho Gonzales defeated  Ismail El Shafei /  Brian Fairlie 6–3, 7–6

References

Los Angeles Open (tennis)
Pacific Southwest
Pacific Southwest Open
Pacific Southwest Open
Pacific Southwest Open